Spennymoor Town Football Club is a football club based in Spennymoor, County Durham, in the North East of England.

The club began playing in the Northern League in 1931–32 as Evenwood Town,  reaching the first round of the FA Cup in the 1956–57 season. In 2005, the club merged with Spennymoor United, who had folded earlier that year, and collectively changed their name to Spennymoor Town.

Spennymoor United

Spennymoor United had some success over the years. Most notable was their success in the 1977–78 season, where they reached the semi-final of the FA Trophy, where they lost to Leatherhead 2–0 away in the first leg and won 2–1 at home in the second Leg, therefore, losing 3–2 on aggregate. That year, Spennymoor United also won the Northern League for the fifth time in the space of 10 years. The following year, Spennymoor reached the 2nd Round of the FA Trophy.

During the 1990–91 season, Spennymoor joined the Northern Counties East League Premier Division and in the 1992–93 season were crowned champions, only on goal difference. The following season, they were runners-up of the Northern Premier League Division One and were promoted to the Premier Division. However, at the turn of the new millennium, with financial troubles resulting in losing 35 out of their 44 fixtures, they were relegated for the first time in their history. In the 2002–03 season, they were promoted back to the Premier Division as runners-up after losing the title on goal difference. The following season, the clubhouse was burnt down on Christmas Day 2003 and the club had lost their main source of income.

Things only went from bad to worse from then on. In the 2004–05 season, they were deducted 24 points after failing to fulfil the fixture list due to not being able to field a side. During that season, manager Graeme Clarke resigned after losing 5–1 to Gateshead on 25 March 2005, followed soon by Secretary Thomas Metcalfe for supposed health reasons. The club resigned from the league after 33 games that season and later folded, which caused controversy over the unfulfilled fixtures.

History
Spennymoor United was reborn under the name of Spennymoor Town, after a merger with Evenwood, who were on the verge of folding in the same year. Out of the gloom, people were working hard and managed to get the club together for the start of 2005–06. Headed by Alan Murray the fans rallied round and formed an independent supporters group, initially with the aim of running the club themselves. Both groups submitted their bids with the local council, but after a meeting held at the Penny Gill pub in Spennymoor, it was agreed to stand down and let Alan Murray's plan go ahead. The application proceeded with the name change to Spennymoor Town, the club were accepted into the Northern League Division Two.

Northern League (2005–2014)

Division Two (2005–2007)
On 13 August 2005, the first league game as Spennymoor Town was to be played at home against Darlington R.A, which was met with a major attraction from the town. The official attendance for that first game was 511 people, in which the newly formed Spennymoor Town were victorious with a 3–2 win. The following Tuesday, The Moors carried on their winning ways, beating Guisborough 3–1. In the first four home games under the new name, one of those including The F.A Cup Preliminary Round, the club attracted over 1300 people to The Brewery Field.

In their first season, the club got off to a good start under then manager Ken Houlahan. In January 2006, Houlahan left his post as manager to become Director of Football and Justin Perry was appointed Player-Manager, finishing the season in a respectable 8th position. But things behind the scenes were not good, a rift between the club and the fans grew, as did the rift between the committee and the chairman. Business man Alan Murray was replaced as Chairman in his absence during a board meeting. During the summer of 2006 the situation came to a head and resulted in the entire committee resigning their posts, taking all but four players with them. The club was taken over by Chairman Alan Murray, with Alan Courtney returning as Vice Chairman. The club also tried to change its name back to Spennymoor United before the 2006–07 season. However, the FA rejected the proposal.

In June 2006, a management team of Jamie Pollock and Moors favourite Jason Ainsley was put in place. Together they put together a strong squad of players. After a slow start, consisting of 6 away games out of the first seven, and a high number of draws, the squad went from strength to strength. They went unbeaten in the league from November, until 7 April 2007, where they travelled to Penrith. Backed by a travelling support of over 150 fans, if they won and Seaham lost, they would be champions. At half time, the news came through that Seaham were losing 3–1. Spennymoor's place was booked as champions when Tom Jones netted an 87th-minute winner.

During the summer of 2007, then Manager Jamie Pollock left the club, stating "he wanted to concentrate on getting his coaching badges and pursue his career at a higher level" and moors favourite Jason Ainsley was swiftly given the position of first team manager. Yet another crisis hit the club during this summer when the council evicted the club from its home of 103 years. However, after a lot of good work by individuals of the football club, in particular the Chairman, Vice Chairman and Secretary Jonathan Le Poidevin, a new 25-year lease was agreed on 25 September 2007, securing the future of the club.

Division One (2007–2014)

Spennymoor's first season back in the 1st Division of the Northern League resulted in them finishing in a mid-table position. They also had a few memorable cup games, defeating higher league opposition in Garforth Town and Brigg Town. They narrowly missed out on a Durham Challenge Cup final appearance against Sunderland, losing the semi-final to a 120th-minute winner 1–0 at Gateshead. In the 2008–09 season, the club chairman resigned, but Spennymoor battled against the odds and finished 4th in the league on goal difference below Newcastle Benfield, Consett and Whitley Bay. Also notable in this season, Spennymoor reached the 5th Round of the FA Vase, losing 2–0 away to Bideford.

The 2009–10 season was a huge success, with the arrival of former Aston Villa player Bradley Groves as Club Chairman, with former England, Newcastle and West Ham United Striker Paul Kitson as President. This led to Spennymoor being crowned Northern Football League Division One Champions with 100 points, at the time being only the third team ever to do so and a feat that was surpassed the season after by winning the league with 103 points. Despite winning the league in three consecutive seasons (2009–10, 2010–11, 2011–12), the club did not apply for promotion as they wanted to be financially stable before they took the next step up. Although an application for promotion was subsequently made after their runners-up position in 2012–13 to Darlington 1883 (again breaking the 100 point mark), the club was not deemed by the FA worthy enough of an offer of promotion. At the beginning of the season, then Assistant Manager Brian Atkinson joined Martin Gray at Darlington 1883 and Gavin Fell took the position of Assistant Manager. Gav helped Whitley Bay towards 3 consecutive FA Vase victories and also spent a year at Blyth Spartans before joining the Moors. Also in this season, Spennymoor reached the final of the FA Vase for the first time and beat Tunbridge Wells 2–1 in front of 16,000 people, followed by a victory parade around the town the following Monday. Along with the cup runs and the loss of winter games due to the bad weather, the season was eventually extended into the middle of May as the club played over 80 games if pre-season friendlies are included.

In the 2013–14 season, Spennymoor Town started off retaining the JR Cleator Cup, as the league champions Darlington declined the invitation to compete. Spennymoor also made their 3rd consecutive appearance in the Durham Challenge Cup final and ultimately lost 2–1 against a strong Shildon side thanks to a last minute Shildon goal. This year Spennymoor won the league for the 4th time in 5 years, beating strong promotion rivals Celtic Nation by 5 points and finishing the season unbeaten at home in league matches.

The NPL 1st Division North (2014–2017)

The club had applied for promotion into the pyramid during the 2013–14 season and played their first competitive game outside of the Northern League away to Padiham on 16 August 2014, winning 2–0.

Spennymoor also had a good run in the FA Cup, reaching the 4th Qualifying Round, beating Tadcaster Albion, Bishop Auckland, Dunston UTS and Ashton United and finally losing in a replay against AFC Telford United. In the first match, Spennymoor were winning 2–0 by the 90th minute, but Telford scored two goals in injury time to secure the replay. In the replay, Spennymoor were beaten 3–0 to secure Telford's place in the 1st Round against Basingstoke Town

Spennymoor recorded their 250th win as Spennymoor Town at home versus Kendal Town on 16 December 2014. On 23 December 2014, then Assistant Manager Gavin Fell left his post after 2 and a half years with the club and was replaced by ex Gateshead and West Auckland manager Anthony Smith. Spennymoor finished their first season in the NPL Division One North in 5th place on 77 points and but lost 3–2 against Darlington 1883 in the play-off semi-final.

In 2016, Spennymoor claimed the runners-up spot in Division One North and entered the play-offs for the second season in succession. Spennymoor saw off Burscough in the semi-final, to set up a final against Northwich Victoria at Brewery Field with Spennymoor winning the game 2–0 in front of 1,129 fans thus sealing promotion for the second time in three years and guaranteeing them a place at Step 3 for the first time since Spennymoor United was dissolved in 2005.

In the 2016–17 season, Spennymoor finished runners-up to Blyth Spartans, qualifying for the play-offs. They saw off Nantwich Town 2–0 at Brewery Field, thus qualifying for the final and a place in the National League North. On 29 April 2017, Spennymoor hosted Stourbridge in the Northern Premier League Premier Division play-off final, a goal from Rob Ramshaw sealed a 1–0 victory at Brewery Field. Spennymoor had therefore reached their highest position in the footballing pyramid of any team from the town and took their place in the National League North for the 2017–18 Season. They also reached the first round of the FA Cup for the first time, losing 3–2 to League One club MK Dons.

National League North (2017–present)

Spennymoor began the 2017–18 season in the National League North for the first time in their history. The Moors reached the FA Trophy quarter-finals for the first time before losing to Bromley. During the 2018–19 season, Spennymoor finished 4th, qualifying for the play-offs. However, they were defeated in the play-off final on penalties by Chorley after a 1–1 draw. In December 2020, Jason Ainsley stepped down as Spennymoor manager by mutual consent after 14 years with the club and after having won eleven trophies with the side.

Stadium

Throughout Spennymoor United's history, their home venue was the Brewery Field. They started using the Brewery Field when the club was formed in 1904 and took over use of it from Tudhoe Rugby Club. The ground itself used to belong to 'Tower Brewery', which was located on King Street, hence the name 'Brewery Field'. The ground is located near the bottom of Spennymoor, on Wood Vue off Durham Road.

After the merger with Evenwood Town, Spennymoor Town were granted the lease from the town council and decided to carry on using The Brewery Field for their home games. Most notably to the fans, the sign over the Wood Vue entrance had the 'United A.F.C.' removed and left with just 'Spennymoor'. In late 2012 and early 2013, a lot of upgrades were made to the ground, including brand new floodlights, manufactured by local company Thorn Lighting to replace the old ones, which had been at the ground for over 40 years. Other improvements were made, such as a tunnel for the players leading into the home and away dressing rooms and new dugouts on the far side of the pitch, as well as new terracing and access for disabled fans. New work is planned to rebuild the old clubhouse that was burnt down on Christmas Day 2003.

Spennymoor Town's biggest attendance at Brewery Field came in February 2013 when 2,670 fans turned out for a Northern Football League Division One game against Championship rivals Darlington.

Supporters and rivalries
The club consists mostly of those who supported Spennymoor United and new supporters who have been attracted to the club over time. Supporters of Spennymoor Town are drawn in from all over the North East and have fans located all over the world who follow the action through the Facebook and Twitter pages. The Moors were the biggest supported club in the Northern league in the 2013–14 season.

Spennymoor's local rivals are considered to be Bishop Auckland, one of the oldest members of the Northern League, who currently play at Heritage Park. Since 2012–13, Spennymoor have had a competitive rivalry with Darlington where they were rivals for the Northern League Championship, Darlington would pip Spennymoor to the title in 2012–13, where both teams finished the season collecting more than 100 points. Both teams met again 2 seasons later in the Northern Premier League Division One North where Darlington bettered Spennymoor in the play-offs. The rivalry was once again ignited in 2017–18 when Spennymoor confirmed their place in the National League North.

Players

Current squad

(Captain)

 (Vice Captain)

Notable players

Leadership & Management

Board & Executive

Club Representatives

Club Management

Coaching staff

First team

Reserves & youth

Managers

Only counts competitive matches.

Performance

League and Cup history

(P) = Promoted
(PO) = Play Offs

1.EP = Extra-Preliminary Round, PRE = Preliminary Round, 1Q = 1st Qualifying Round, 2Q = 2nd Qualifying Round, 3Q = 3rd Qualifying Round,4Q = 4th Qualifying Round, 1R = 1st Round, 2R= 2nd Round, 3R= 3rd Round, 5R= 5th Round, W = Winners, N/A = Not Applicable

2.Updated as of end of 2019–20 season.

Cup standings

FA Cup

FA Trophy

FA Vase

Durham County Challenge Cup

Doodson Sports Cup

Honours
Spennymoor Town's honours include the following:

League
Northern Premier League
Premier Division play-off winners (1) – 2016–17
Division One play-off winners (1) – 2015–16
Northern League
Division One champions (4) – 2009–10, 2010–11, 2011–12, 2013–14
Division One runners-up (1) – 2012–13
Division Two champions (1) – 2006–07
Cups
FA Vase
Winners – 2012–13
Durham County Challenge Cup
Winners (1) – 2011–12
Runners-up (2) – 2012–13, 2013–14
Brooks Mileson Memorial League Cup
Winners (1) – 2012–13
Runners-up (1) – 2010–11
JR Cleator Cup
Winners (4) – 2011–12, 2012–13, 2013–14, 2014–15

Records

Club Records
Best FA Cup Performance: 1st Round Proper v MK Dons, 2015–16
Best FA Trophy Performance: Quarter-finals v Bromley, 2017–18
Best FA Vase Performance: Winners v Tunbridge Wells, 4 May 2013
Furthest travelled for an English Cup Competition: 432 Miles v Guernsey, FA Vase Semi-final 1st Leg, 23 March 2013
Record Points: 109 Points, 2012–13 Season
Biggest Home Victory: 10–0 v Billingham Town, Northern Football League Division 1, 18 March 2014
Biggest Away Victory: 7–0 v Billingham Town, Northern Football League Division 1, 11 January 2014
Biggest Home Defeat: 6–1 v Bamber Bridge, Northern Premier League Division One North, 8 November 2014
Biggest Away Defeat: 8–2 v Clitheroe, FA Cup 2nd Qualifying Round, 29 September 2007
Biggest Home Attendance: 2,670 v Darlington 1883, Northern Football League Division 1, 15 February 2013
Longest Unbeaten Home Run: (League) 46 Games, 8 January 2011 – 15 February 2013
Longest Unbeaten Away Run: (League) 20 Games, 14 April 2012 – 18 April 2013
Most games won in a row: (League) 19 Games, 31 March 2012 – 10 October 2012
Most games lost in a row: (League) 3 Games, 11 April 2006 – 18 April 2006

Player Records
Record goalscorer: Glen Taylor, 140 Goals
Player with most appearances: Lewis Dodds, 227 Appearances
Player with most goals in a single season: Liam Henderson, 37 Goals, 2013–14 Season
Players with most goals in one match:- Craig Hubbard, Home vs Morpeth Town, 28 April 2010, 4 Goals- Michael Rae, Away vs Billingham Town, 9 October 2010, 4 Goals- Liam Henderson, Home vs Billingham Town, 18 March 2014, 4 Goals

Statistics

League Attendances

Top League Goalscorer

Affiliated Clubs 
 Spennymoor Town Youth FC (See below)
 Sunderland
 Coxhoe Athletic
 Parkhill FC 
 Plymouth Parkway FC
 Esh Winning FC

References

External links

Official Website
Official Facebook Page
Official Twitter Page

 
Football clubs in England
Northern Football League
Northern Premier League clubs
Football clubs in County Durham
2005 establishments in England
Association football clubs established in 2005
Spennymoor
National League (English football) clubs